Fred Blatter (born 25 September 1949) is a Swiss former professional tennis player.

Born in Zürich, Blatter was a Davis Cup player for Switzerland, with an appearance in a tie against Romania in Bucharest in 1972. He competed in the doubles rubber against Ilie Năstase and Ion Țiriac, as well as a dead rubber singles against Petre Mărmureanu, losing both.

Blatter featured in the men's doubles main draw at the 1974 Australian Open, where he and his Swiss partner Petr Kanderal made it to the third round.

See also
List of Switzerland Davis Cup team representatives

References

External links
 
 
 

1949 births
Living people
Swiss male tennis players
Tennis players from Zürich